The Republic of Vietnam National Police – RVNP, Police Nationale de la République du Vietnam or Police Nationale for short ( – CSQG) in French, was the official South Vietnamese national police force from 1962 to 1975, operating closely with the Army of the Republic of Vietnam (ARVN) during the Vietnam War.


History
The Republic of Vietnam National Police was officially created by President Ngô Đình Diệm's national decree in June 1962, integrating all the existing internal security and paramilitary agencies raised by the French Union authorities during the First Indochina War between 1946 and 1954, into a single National Police Force who answered to the Directorate General of National Police (Vietnamese: Tổng cục cảnh sát quốc gia – TCCSQG).  These included the Vietnamese Sûreté, the Saigon Municipal Police, elements of the colonial National Guard of South Vietnam ( – GNVS, or VBNV in Vietnamese), a rural Gendarmerie force or 'Civil Guard', the combat police and various provincial militia forces made of irregular auxiliaries.  Transferred to South Vietnamese control in 1955, all the aforementioned security units were integrated in the early 1960s into a new national police force with the exception of the Civil Guard, which was placed under the Ministry of Defence. The CSQG had an initial strength of only 16,000 uniformed and plainclothes agents, being essentially an urban constabulary with no rural Gendarmerie component to counter the threat posed by the increasing Viet Cong (VC) insurgency in the countryside.

The National Police under Diệm

Even before the official creation of the National Police, President Diệm was quick to employ the security forces inherited from the French in repressing both internal political dissent and organized crime.  Throughout the late 1950s and into 1960, they helped the Vietnamese National Army (VNA) in suppressing the Hòa Hảo and Cao Đài militant religious and political sects, with approximately 25,000 armed militiamen, and the smaller but better organized Bình Xuyên Saigon-based gangster group.

The final years 1971-75
The CSQG strength peaked in February 1971 at 103,859 personnel – including 3,144 female agents, mostly engaged in clerical work –, 4,450 vehicles and some 830 motorcycles of various types. However, out of this total only 27,565 officers and enlisted men were of career status, the remainder being on contract, daily paid or floating assimilated. Plans were drawn late that year to further expand the Police to 124,050 and later to 160,000, though the actual authorized strength in 1973 stood at about 130,000 men and women.

Structure
The CSQG was organized at national level with logistical and administrative support from Saigon, but individual police departments were under the operational control of the provincial police chiefs. All components of the Police system were administered directly by the Directorate General of National Police (TCCSQG) at the National Police Headquarters in Saigon, which also provided technical or combat support for law-enforcement and other internal security duties throughout the Country. The Directorate General was headed by Sub-Brigadier general Nguyễn Ngọc Loan, who led a staff comprising a deputy director and six assistant directors for administration, personnel and training, intelligence, operations, Field Forces and scientific police. By the late 1960s, the Vietnamese National Police was organized into nine major specialized departments or 'branches', which were:

 River and Coastal Police
 Traffic Control Police
 Judiciary Police
 Special Police
 Scientific Police
 Police Medical Service
 Administration Service
 VIP Protection Service
 Field Police

Training facilities
All instruction and management of training facilities fell upon the Personnel and Training Directorate (Vietnamese: Ban nhân sự và đào tạo) at National Police headquarters in Saigon. Recruits first underwent the basic 12-week course, which consisted primarily of weapons handling, tactics, Taekwondo and drill, ministered at the main CSQG Training Centre (Vietnamese: Trung tâm đào tạo CSQG) located at Rach Dua, near Vũng Tàu.  After finishing the course, the best-qualified students were selected to be sent for officer training to the National Police Academy (Vietnamese: Học viện cảnh sát quốc gia) at Hoc Viên, where they attended advanced instruction programs at all levels, which comprised:

 Officer promotion courses up to and including the rank of Lieutenant colonel;
 Administrative and staff training;
 Senior officer seminars;
 Judicial Police training for officers and NCOs;
 Instructors' courses at both officer and lower rank levels.

Those recruits with lower qualifications went instead to the Non-commissioned Officer (NCO) School run by the ARVN at its Combat Training Centre (Vietnamese: Trung tâm huấn luyện chiến đấu) in Da Lat, co-located to the namesake South Vietnamese Armed Forces Military Academy, where they received special training that would enable them to graduate as Police NCOs.

Specialists such as field policemen, patrol boat crewmen, vehicle drivers (this category included squad car, armoured car and Jeep drivers, and motorcyclists), radio operators, medics, mechanics, and clerks were trained in various other National Police and Armed Forces' schools. More specialized training was also provided to selected male and female personnel assigned to the other CSQG branches. River and Coastal Police boat crews were trained at the Marine Police Training Centre (Vietnamese: Trung tâm huấn luyện cảnh sát biển) co-located at their Phú Xuân HQ, near Huế. Field Police personnel – including officers and NCOs – underwent eight weeks' of training in paramilitary skills at the Mã Lai Á and Phi Luât Tân CSQG training Centres. Instruction covered subjects such as jungle warfare, intelligence-gathering operations, law-enforcement and riot control techniques.  To upgrade their capabilities, squads and platoons were returned periodically to these training centers for six weeks of unit refresher training, but for most CSDC companies and battalions posted in the provinces their refresher course actually took place at the regional training centers.

Foreign assistance 
Additional military "on the job" training was provided to Field Police units in the field by U.S. Mobile Training Teams or by Australian advisors from the Australian Army Training Team Vietnam (AATTV). Selected officer students attended specialized courses at the International Police Academy in Washington, D.C. while other students were sent to the Royal Malaysian Police Field Force Special Training Centre at Kentonmen, Ulu Kinta, Perak in Malaysia to attend advanced specialized police and instructor's courses; after graduation, some of these new National Police officers upon returning to South Vietnam would them be posted as Field Police instructors at the Police training centres to pass on their skills to CSDC recruits.

List of National Police Director-Generals
 Lại Văn Sang
 Mai Hữu Xuân
 Nguyễn Ngọc Lễ
 Nguyễn Văn Tôn
 Trần Vĩnh Ðắt
 Trần Bá Thành
 Nguyễn Chữ
 Nguyễn Văn Hay
 Trần Văn Tư
 Nguyễn Văn Là
 Nguyễn Ngọc Loan
 Phạm Xuân Chiểu
 Ðàm Trung Mộc
 Nguyễn Văn Y

List of National Police Commanders
 Trần Thanh Phong
 Nguyễn Khắc Bình

Weapons and equipment
The CSQG was lightly armed by military standards, but heavily armed by conventional police standards. Initially, most of its weaponry was surplus World War II/Korean War-vintage. From 1969, rifles, carbines and submachine guns began to be replaced by assault rifles and although the latter became the CSQG's primary weapon, it never displaced entirely the earlier weaponry. Police units had no crew-served weapon systems such as mortars or any other indirect fire weapons.

M1917 revolver
Smith & Wesson Model 10 Revolver
Smith & Wesson SW2 Bodyguard .38 Special snub-nose revolver
Colt Cobra .38 Special snub-nose revolver
Smith & Wesson Model 39 Pistol
Colt.45 M1911A1 Automatic pistol 
M1 Garand Battle rifle
M1 Carbine
M2 Carbine
M3 and M3A1 "Grease Gun" submachine guns
IMI Uzi submachine gun
M1A1 Thompson submachine gun
M16A1 Assault rifle 
Ithaca Model 37 Pump-action shotgun 
Stevens Model 77E Pump-action shotgun
M1918A2 BAR Light machine gun
M60 Machine Gun
Browning M1919A4 .30 Cal Medium machine gun
M79 Grenade Launcher

Vehicles
Willys MB Jeep
Willys M38 MC Jeep
Dodge M37 utility truck
Kaiser Jeep M715 utility truck
M8 Greyhound Light armoured car

Uniforms and insignia
The Traffic Control Police agents were given an all-white cotton service uniform consisting of a long-sleeved shirt and trousers, worn with a matching white peaked cap; the shirt had dark blue removable shoulder boards and badges and other insignia were in silvered metal.  

Field Police troopers were given a black beret, worn French-style pulled to the left with the National Police cap badge placed above the right eye.

A US M-1 Helmet liner painted in shiny black, marked with white-and-red stripes at the sides and the initials "TC" (Vietnamese: Tuần Cảnh – patrol) was worn by National Police constables assigned patrol duties or riot control in urban areas.

Rank insignia

1955–1962 ranks
Cảnh sát viên – Patrolman/Patrolwoman
Thẩm sát viên – Inspector
Biên tập viên – Redactor
Quận trưởng – Commissioner
Kiểm tra – Controller
Tổng kiểm tra – Controller General

1962–1971 ranks
Cảnh sát viên – Patrolman/Patrolwoman
Phó thẩm sát viên công nhựt – Acting Sub-inspector
Phó thẩm sát viên – Sub-inspector
Phó thẩm sát viên thượng hạng – Sub-inspector 1st class
Thẩm sát viên công nhựt – Station inspector 
Thẩm sát viên – Inspector
Thẩm sát viên thượng hạng – Chief inspector
Biên tập viên công nhựt – Superintendent
Biên tập viên – Chief superintendent
Biên tập viên thượng hạng – Deputy commissioner
Quận trưởng – Commissioner
Quận trưởng thượng hạng – Commissioner 1st class
Kiểm tra – Director
Tổng kiểm tra – Director General of Police

1971–1975 ranks
Cảnh sát viên – Patrolman/Patrolwoman
Trung sĩ nhất – Sergeant first class
Thượng sĩ – Master sergeant
Thượng sĩ nhất – First sergeant
Thiếu úy – Second lieutenant
Trung úy – First lieutenant
Đại úy – Captain 
Thiếu tá – Major 
Trung tá – Lieutenant colonel 
Đại tá – Colonel  
Chuẩn tướng – Brigadier general 
Thiếu tướng – Major general 
Trung tướng – Lieutenant general/Deputy Director-General 
Đại tướng – General/Director-General

See also
 Army of the Republic of Vietnam (ARVN)
 Central Intelligence Agency
 Civilian Irregular Defense Groups
 First Indochina War
 Khmer National Police
 MIKE Force
 Royal Thai Police Aerial Resupply Unit (PARU)
 Phoenix Program
 Provincial Reconnaissance Units 
 Republic of Vietnam
 Republic of Vietnam Military Forces
 Royal Lao Police
 Royal Malaysian Police
 Vietnam War
 Weapons of the Vietnam War

Endnotes

References

 Gordon L. Rottman and Ramiro Bujeiro, Army of the Republic of Vietnam 1955–75, Men-at-arms series 458, Osprey Publishing Ltd, Oxford 2010. 
 James Arnold, Tet Offensive 1968 – Turning point in Vietnam, Campaign series 4, Osprey Publishing Ltd, London 1990. 
 Kevin Lyles, Vietnam ANZACs – Australian & New Zealand Troops in Vietnam 1962–72, Elite series 103, Osprey Publishing Ltd, Oxford 2004. 
 Lee E. Russell and Mike Chappell, Armies of the Vietnam War 2, Men-at-arms series 143, Osprey Publishing Ltd, London 1983. .
 Leroy Thompson, US Combat Shotguns, Weapon series 29, Osprey Publishing Ltd, Oxford 2013. 
 Michael H. Kluever, Weapons Backdate – Trench Guns, in Command magazine – Military History, Strategy & Analysis, Issue 36, March 1996, pp. 12–13.
 Nigel de Lee, Chapter 2 – Southeast Asia: the impact of Mao Tse-tung (pp. 48–61) in John Pimlott (ed.), Guerrilla Warfare, Bison Books Ltd., London 1985. 
 Phillip Katcher and Mike Chappell, Armies of the Vietnam War 1962–1975, Men-at-arms series 104, Osprey Publishing Ltd, London 1980. 
 Sir Robert Thompson et al., Report on the Republic of Vietnam National Police, 1971. [available online at http://www.counterinsurgency.org/1971%20Thompson%20Police/Thompson%20Police.htm]
 Thanh Kim Pham, Lịch sử ngành Cảnh sát Quốc gia VNCH. (in Vietnamese)
 Valéry Tarrius, La Police de Campagne du Sud-Vietnam 1967–1975, in Armes Militaria magazine, March 2005 issue, Histoire & Collections, Paris, pp. 37–43.  (in French)

Further reading

 Leroy Thompson, Michael Chappell, Malcolm McGregor and Ken MacSwan, Uniforms of the Indo-China and Vietnam Wars, Blandford Press, London 1984. 
 Martin Windrow and Mike Chappell, The French Indochina War 1946–54, Men-at-arms series 322, Osprey Publishing Ltd, Oxford 1998. 
 Kenneth Conboy and Simon McCouaig, South-East Asian Special Forces, Elite series 33, Osprey Publishing Ltd, London 1991.

External links
Federation of South Vietnam Police Associations (in Vietnamese)
The "White Mice" of Vietnam 
RVN National Police at globalsecurity.org
 http://www.militaria-mag.com
 http://camopedia.org/index.php?title=Republic_of_Vietnam
 http://www.polinsignia.com/vietnam.htm

National Central Bureaus of Interpol
Defunct law enforcement agencies of South Vietnam
1975 disestablishments in Vietnam